A Good Ground is the second LP released by Oxford Collapse. It was originally released on Kanine Records, but has since been made available by Sub Pop.

Track listing 

 "Empty Fields" – 1:10
 "Prop Cars" – 3:01
 "Last American Virgin" – 3:06
 "The Boys Go Home" – 4:06
 "Dusty Horses Practice" – 3:45
 "Cracks in the Causeway" – 3:58
 "Flora Y Fauna" – 1:33
 "Proofreading" – 3:53
 "Flaws" – 3:57
 "No Great Shakes" – 3:14
 "Volunteers" – 2:34
 "Keep 'Em in a Canyon" – 5:00

References
 Kanine Records artist page
 Sub Pop album page
 Oxford Collapse official website

2005 albums
Oxford Collapse albums
Kanine Records albums